Who Stole the Kishka?, originally spelled "Who Stole the Keeshka?" is a polka song written by Walter Dana (music) and Walter Solek (lyrics). It was recorded and performed by various bands. One popular version was familiar to American radio audiences from a 1963 recording by Grammy award-winning polka artist Frankie Yankovic.

According to an obituary for Walt Solek, who wrote and recorded the song, "Keeshka always gets the crowd going at a Polkaholics show as it has since it was recorded in the 1950s with English lyrics!"

The song ends with the pleading refrain "but please bring back my kishka".

See also
Kishka

References

External links
 Allmusic 

Polkas
American songs
Songs with music by Władysław Daniłowski
Year of song missing